Jarvis Jaray Moss (born August 3, 1984) is a former college and professional American football player who was a defensive end in the National Football League (NFL) for five seasons.  He played college football for the University of Florida, received All-American honors, and was a member of a BCS National Championship team in 2006.  Moss was drafted by the Denver Broncos in the first round of the 2007 NFL Draft, and played professionally for the Broncos and Oakland Raiders.

Early years

Moss was born in Denton, Texas in 1984.  He attended Billy Ryan High School in Denton, where he was instrumental in helping the Ryan Raiders win their first Texas Class 4A state championship.  He played in the 2003 U.S. Army All-American Bowl, and was recognized as a Parade magazine high school All-American.

College career

Moss accepted an athletic scholarship to attend the University of Florida in Gainesville, Florida, where he played for coach Ron Zook and coach Urban Meyer's Florida Gators football teams from 2004 to 2006.

Memorably, Moss blocked two crucial kicks in the fourth quarter of the Gators' 2006 victory over the South Carolina Gamecocks.  The first block stopped a Gamecock point after touchdown (PAT) to keep South Carolina's lead at 16–10.  The second was a block of a would-be game-winning field goal for South Carolina with eight seconds left on the game clock, and secured a 17–16 victory for the Gators.  He was named a first-team All-American by Pro Football Weekly after the 2006 season.

Moss declared for the 2007 NFL Draft following the Gators' victory in the 2007 BCS National Championship Game.

Professional career

2007 NFL Draft

The Denver Broncos traded up in the draft with the Jacksonville Jaguars to select Moss 17th overall. The Jaguars used the pick from the Broncos to select Reggie Nelson, one of Moss' Florida Gators college teammates.

Bench press: 365 lbs
Squat: 415 lbs

Denver Broncos

During the  season, Moss played in six games for the Denver Broncos.  He recorded 12 tackles and 1 sack.  Moss broke his shin in practice on November 1, 2007, and was placed on injured reserve on November 2, 2007, ending his season.

During the  season,  Moss played in 12 games, recording 12 tackles and 2.5 sacks.

The Broncos' new defensive coordinator, Mike Nolan, moved Moss to outside linebacker, after he had spent his entire NFL career as a defensive end.  During the 2009 training camp, it was reported that Moss was contemplating retirement because of struggles adapting to the defensive schemes.  After several days of contemplation, Moss returned to practice and made the Broncos' 53-man roster after a pre-season performance that included three tackles, one sack and one forced fumble.  After All-Pro Elvis Dumervil's potentially season-ending injury, Moss was announced to be the top candidate to take over as the starting outside linebacker.

On November 17, 2010, Moss was released by the Denver Broncos.

Oakland Raiders

On November 23, 2010, Moss was signed by the Oakland Raiders to play defensive end, replacing the injured Trevor Scott. On July 26, the Raiders resigned Moss to a one-year, $1.25 million contract.  He played in thirteen games during the  season, all but one of them in reserve.  Following the season, his one-year contract expired and he became a free agent.

NFL statistics

See also

 2006 College Football All-America Team
 2006 Florida Gators football team
 List of Denver Broncos first-round draft picks
 List of Florida Gators football All-Americans
 List of Florida Gators in the NFL Draft

References

Bibliography

 Carlson, Norm, University of Florida Football Vault: The History of the Florida Gators, Whitman Publishing, LLC, Atlanta, Georgia (2007).  .

External links
 Jarvis Moss – Florida Gators player profile

1984 births
Living people
Sportspeople from Denton, Texas
Players of American football from Texas
African-American players of American football
American football defensive ends
American football outside linebackers
Florida Gators football players
All-American college football players
Denver Broncos players
Oakland Raiders players
21st-century African-American sportspeople
20th-century African-American people